WVA numbers (Waren-Vertriebs-Artikel-Nummern) are a reference and assignment system for brake linings, clutch facings, brake shoes and other friction materials which will especially be used in road vehicles but also in mechanical engineering. The WVA numbering system has been developed by the "VRI-Verband der Reibbelagindustrie" (Federation of Friction Industry), Cologne / Germany. The VRI is the German Federation of Friction Industry and a member of FEMFM - Federation of European Manufacturers of Friction Materials.

Taking the dimensionally determined parameters of the friction materials into account the system assigns the differently dimensioned linings to the respective areas of application and use and accordingly offers a basis for the cooperation and for the exchange of information between manufacturers, distributors and customers.

Structure 

WVA Numbers - Allocation Scheme:

External links
 VRI-Verband der Reibbelagindustrie e.V.
 Federation of European Manufacturers of Friction Materials

Vehicle braking technologies